John Fleming St. Andrew Denton (11 September 1872 – 19 April 1949) was a British actor and film director of the silent era.

Denton was born in Ashby-de-la-Zouch, Leicestershire and died at age 76 in Redhill, Surrey.

Selected filmography
Actor
 Little Lord Fauntleroy (1914)
 In the Ranks (1914)
 The World, the Flesh and the Devil (1914)
 Flying from Justice (1915)
 She (1916)
 The Bachelor's Club (1921)
 The Card (1922)
 The Fair Maid of Perth (1923)
 The York Mystery (1924)
 Old Bill Through the Ages (1924)
 The Notorious Mrs. Carrick (1924)
 Tons of Money (1924)
 The Gay Corinthian (1924)

Director
 Barnaby (1919)
 A Lass o' the Looms (1919)
 The Heart of a Rose (1919)
 Ernest Maltravers (1920)
 The Twelve Pound Look (1920)
 Lady Audley's Secret (1920)
 Sybil (1921)

References

External links

1872 births
1949 deaths
English male stage actors
English male film actors
English male silent film actors
20th-century English male actors
English film directors
19th-century British male actors
British male stage actors
20th-century British male actors